Mariana, is an administrative division in eastern Metro Manila, the Philippines. It is an urban barangay in Quezon City in a middle class residential and commercial area known as New Manila, which includes Barangay Mariana and the adjacent Barangay Damayang Lagi.

The barangay's land boundaries are defined by the España Boulevard Extension (now E. Rodriguez Sr. Avenue), Ilang-ilang Street, Rosario Drive, Victoria Avenue, and Aurora Boulevard, while its water boundaries are defined by the Salapan Creek (also known as the Ermitaño Creek).

It is bordered by Barangay Damayang Lagi to the west, Barangays Kalusugan, and Kristong Hari to the north, Barangay Immaculate Concepcion to the east, Barangays Kaunlaran and Valencia to the south, and San Juan's Barangay Ermitaño to the southwest.

History
Prior to the 1920s, the area that would become known as New Manila was once a hilly, underdeveloped hinterland along the shoreline of the San Juan River, at the outskirts of Manila. Eventually, as Manila became crowded, noisy, and polluted, new developments in the nearby San Juan became popular among middle-class families for a much more quiet and peaceful place to live.

New Manila subdivision
In the 1920s, Lebanese immigrant Doña Magdalena Hemady purchased  of land from friar lands bought by the Taft Commission as a result of Act No. 1120, also known as the Friar Lands Act of 1904. These lands acquired by Doña Hemady became known as the Magdalena Estate, with among these friar lands was land owned by the Ortigas family, which in turn was previously owned by the Augustinian Order as the Hacienda de Mandaluyon.

Around 1922 to 1923, Doña Hemady and her second husband Kemal H. Hemady developed the land into the New Manila Subdivisions as a residential enclave for the elite, becoming the first real estate developer in the country, and establishing what would be the first gated community outside of Manila. On the other hand, lots along the side streets, numbered 1st to 13th after the numbered streets in New York City, measured at approximately  each.

In 1937, the New Manila area gained recognition as the "Hollywood of the Philippines", being home to Sampaguita Pictures (along Granada Street, now located in Barangay Valencia), as well as its rival, LVN Pictures, being one of the first companies that produced original Filipino films.

Post-war developments
Throughout the 1940s, being far from Manila, the area was able to survive with minimal ruin during World War II. This has led to increased development throughout the 1950s and 1960s around the area, as schools, churches, hospitals, and other institutions were set up in New Manila.

In 1946, the St. Paul University System set up a Quezon City branch in New Manila, which would be known as St. Paul College Quezon City (now St. Paul University Quezon City). This was followed by the evangelist Jubilee Christian Elementary School (now Jubilee Christian Academy) moving into a new elementary campus across St. Paul in 1980 and a high school and preschool campus just outside New Manila along E. Rodriguez Sr. Avenue in 2002 and 2003.

In 1954, the Carmelites purchased a  property along Broadway Avenue to construct the Chapel of Our Lady of Mount Carmel (now the Minor Basilica of the National Shrine of Our Lady of Mount Carmel). It was inaugurated on July 16, 1964, on the feast day of Our Lady of Mount Carmel, and was declared a parish in 1975.

In 1961, the Dispensary of St. Luke the Beloved Physician (now St. Lukes Medical Center) moved from its original 52-bed hospital in Tondo, Manila to a new property along E. Rodriguez Sr. Avenue, within reach of New Manila. That same year, the New Manila area was included in the barrio of Mariana in through Quezon City Ordinance No. 4816, which was later converted into a barangay in the 1970s. It was named after Mariana Wilson, one of the original residents of the New Manila area who was known among its residents for spearheading many of social activities within the community.

Present day
The continuing migration of middle-class families towards new suburban developments outside of Manila resulted in available housing in the New Manila area to reach its peak in 1961. At some point as well, the New Manila area ceased to exist as a gated community and was completely opened to outside traffic, with only some roads remaining gated at certain hours of the day. As a result, throughout the 1980s, many of the original, large suburban houses were replaced by higher density developments such as townhouses, condominiums, and mixed-use complexes.

In 2012, the Quezon City government allocated a budget of  million to move the Quezon Heritage House, a  two-storey house owned by former Philippine president and city namesake Manuel L. Quezon from its original location along Gilmore Avenue to a dedicated area within the Quezon Memorial Shrine. The reconstructed house was opened to the public on October 21, 2013 by Quezon City mayor Herbert Bautista and vice mayor Joy Belmonte.

Education

 DML Montessori School - Quezon City
 Foundation for Carmelite Scholastics
 Jubilee Christian Academy - Hemady Campus
 St. Paul University Quezon City

Health
 Mariana Barangay Hall Clinic

Landmarks
 
 Basilica of the National Shrine of Our Lady of Mount Carmel
 Jubilee Evangelical Church
 Mariana Park
 Quezon City Reception House (Office of the Vice President of the Philippines)
 St. Joseph Convent of Perpetual Adoration (Pink Sister's Convent)
 Wisdom Park

Transport

Roads and streets

Mariana has a grid road layout, with its latitudinal roads named numerically from 1st to 13th, and its longitudinal roads serving as main thoroughfares. Victoria Avenue (named after Doña Hemady's daughter-in-law, Victoria Cortes Ysmael), Broadway Avenue, Gilmore Avenue, Doña Hemady Avenue (formerly named Pacific Avenue), and Balete Drive serve as north–south thoroughfares within the area, while E. Rodgriguez Sr. Avenue and Aurora Boulevard serves as outlying east–west thoroughfares.

All roads in the barangay are two-lane roads. Victoria Avenue, Broadway Avenue, and Balete Drive run in a two-way direction while Gilmore Avenue runs in a one-way direction going south, and Doña Hemady Avenue runs in a one-way direction going north.

Bus routes
Bus Route 10 (Cubao-Doroteo Jose) serves the Aurora Boulevard area with stops at Betty Go-Belmonte Street, Robinsons Magnolia, Gilmore Avenue, and Madison Street while Bus Route 11 (Taytay-Gilmore) has its west terminus along Gilmore Avenue in the adjacent Barangay Valencia. Jeepneys run along E. Rodriguez Avenue with routes going to and from Manila, Cubao, and the Tomas Morato Avenue area.

Jeepney routes
Jeepneys pass through Aurora Boulevard to and from the Cubao district and Stop & Shop (a name for the area of Old Santa Mesa Road in Santa Mesa, Manila). 
 Parang Stop & Shop - Cubao (T285)

Tricycle terminals
Tricycles ply the New Manila area directly through New Manila Tricycle Operators and Drivers' Association (TODA) terminals located at Madison Street, 3rd Street corner Gilmore Avenue, and Victoria Avenue corner E. Rodriguez Sr. Avenue.

Railways
Mariana is served by Gilmore Station and Betty Go-Belmonte Station of the LRT Line 2.

Government
The seat of government of Mariana is located at 4th Street corner New Jersey Street, a compound which also includes the barangay's multi-purpose facilities and materials recovery facility.

Demographics
Barangay Mariana is the 56th most-populated barangay in Quezon City, with a population of 11,967 people according to the 2020 census, up from a population of 11,227 people in the 2015 census.

The insignia of the barangay seal is a green mango, owing to the prominence of mango trees planted along Gilmore Avenue and Broadway Avenue that were originally planted by Doña Hemady and her laborers.

References

Barangays of Metro Manila
Barangays of Quezon City
Quezon City